is  the assistant coach of the Chiba Jets Funabashi in the Japanese B.League.

Head coaching record

|- 
| style="text-align:left;"|Otsuka Corporation Alphas
| style="text-align:left;"|2006-07
| -||-||-|||| style="text-align:center;"|4th|||-||-||-||
| style="text-align:center;"|-
|-
|- 
| style="text-align:left;"|Link Tochigi Brex
| style="text-align:left;"|2007-08
| 16||13||3|||| style="text-align:center;"|3rd|||2||2||0||
| style="text-align:center;"|JBL2 Champions
|-
| style="text-align:left;"|Rera Kamuy Hokkaido
| style="text-align:left;"|2011
| 14||4||10|||| style="text-align:center;"|8th|||-||-||-||
| style="text-align:center;"|-
|-
|-

References

1978 births
Living people
Chiba Jets Funabashi coaches
Japanese basketball coaches

Utsunomiya Brex coaches
Otsuka Corporation Alphas coaches

Yokohama Excellence players